Orphée Meneghini (born 28 June 1934) is a French racing cyclist. He rode in the 1959 Tour de France.

References

1934 births
Living people
French male cyclists
Place of birth missing (living people)